Ratra House, sometimes called Little Ratra, is one of the minor state residences located in Dublin's Phoenix Park. Until 2006 it was used as the Civil Defence School.

The building, which dates from the early 19th century, was originally known as the Little Lodge. From 1876, it became the official residence of the Private Secretary to the Lord Lieutenant of Ireland, who lived out of season in the next door Viceregal Lodge. Its first resident in this capacity was Lord Randolph Churchill, who was appointed as Private Secretary by the then Lord Lieutenant, his father John Spencer-Churchill, 7th Duke of Marlborough. Churchill lived there with his wife Lady Randolph Churchill and his young son Winston Churchill. Winston Churchill in his writings described his four years, from the ages of two to six, spent in the Little Lodge as among the happiest of his life. It was claimed that he developed his interest in the military from watching military parades at the Lodge.

Following Irish independence in 1922 the house was used for some years by staff of the Governor-General of the Irish Free State before becoming the official residence of Adjutant General of the Irish Army, Major General Brennan between 1926 and 1940.

It was the last Irish state residence to be connected to the ESB grid, eventually becoming connected in 1937.

In 1945, the wheelchair-using retiring first President of Ireland, Douglas Hyde was judged too ill to return to his Roscommon country house, Ratra. It was decided instead to move him into the vacant residence in the grounds of the Lodge (then renamed Áras an Uachtaráin). Hyde named the residence Little Ratra in honour of his old home. Hyde died there in 1949.

On 18 June 1951 it became the headquarters of the newly formed Irish Civil Defence and renamed Ratra House. The Irish Civil Defence School was relocated to Roscrea, County Tipperary in 2006, but Ratra House remains in use as an administrative building. Parts of the complex are still used by the Civil Defence, such as the purpose-built training range used by firemen and rescue personnel.

Today, Ratra House is the headquarters of Gaisce – The President's Award.

References

Buildings and structures in Dublin (city)
Phoenix Park